Katrya Hrynevycheva (Ukrainian:Катря Гриневичева) (November 19, 1875 – December 25, 1947) was a Ukrainian writer and community leader.

Biography
Katrya Hrynevycheva was born in Vynnyky, Ukraine in 1875. Hrynevycheva was a teacher, married with three children. She wrote poetry and prose for various journals from 1893 with the support of Vasyl Stefanyk and Ivan Franko. From 1909 she was the editor of the children's magazine Dzvinok. After the end of the First World war Hrynevycheva worked for  the newspaper Ukraïns’ke slovo. She wrote in Ukrainian and captured the folk vernacular as well as historical phrases in her works. Hrynevycheva wrote several collections of short stories and novelettes. Her biography was published in Toronto in 1968.

Hrynevycheva worked as a teacher in the Austro-Hungarian Internment camps during the war and wrote for Vistnyk, the Herald of the Union for the Liberation of Ukraine. She was elected to the position of president of the Ukrainian Women's Union in 1922 in Galicia. Hrynevycheva died in Berchtesgaden, Germany in 1947.

Works
Legendy i opovidannia (Legends and Short Stories, 1902)
 Po dorozi v Sykhem (On the Way to Sychem, 1923)
 Nepoborni (The Invincible, 1926, about Galician internees)
Sholomy v sontsi (Helmets in the Sun, 1924, 1929), 
Shestykrylets’ (The Six-Winged One, 1935, 1936).

References

1875 births
1947 deaths
People from Vynnyky
20th-century Ukrainian women writers